Mame Saher Thioune  (born December 21, 1989), is a Senegalese international footballer playing as a defender for Al-Shabab.

International debut
On May 10, 2010 Mame Saher Thioune made his first international cap with Senegal against Mexico in a friendly match.

Awards
 Finalist UFOA Cup 2010 with Casa Sports
 Senegal champion in 2012 with Casa Sports
 Vice-champion of Senegal in 2008 and 2009 with Casa Sports
 Winner of the Senegal FA Cup in 2011 with Casa Sports
 Finalist of the Senegal FA Cup in 2013 and 2015 with Casa Sports
 Winner of the Senegalese League Cup in 2010 and 2013 with Casa Sports

References

External links

1989 births
Living people
Senegalese footballers
Senegalese expatriate footballers
Senegal international footballers
Association football fullbacks
Naft Al-Basra SC players
Expatriate footballers in Morocco
Expatriate footballers in Iraq
Ittihad Tanger players
Chabab Atlas Khénifra players
Al-Shabab SC (Kuwait) players
Kuwait Premier League players
Expatriate footballers in Kuwait
Senegalese expatriate sportspeople in Kuwait
Senegalese expatriate sportspeople in Morocco
Senegalese expatriate sportspeople in Iraq
Casa Sports players
Senegal A' international footballers
2011 African Nations Championship players